The 2001 Ukrainian Amateur Cup  was the sixth annual season of Ukraine's football knockout competition for amateur football teams. The competition started on 22 July 2001 and concluded on 6 October 2001.

Teams

Notes:

Competition schedule

First round (1/8)

Quarterfinals (1/4)
Some teams, Systema-KKhP Cherniakhiv and Zirka Koriukivka, started at quarterfinals.

Semifinals (1/2)

Final

See also
 2001 Ukrainian Football Amateur League
 2001–02 Ukrainian Cup

External links
 2001 Ukrainian Amateur Cup at the Footpass (Football Federation of Ukraine)

2001
Amateur Cup
Ukrainian Amateur Cup